Benjamin "Ben" Stark is an American Magic: The Gathering player. His career accomplishments include back to back Pro Tour Top 8s in 2004 and winning Pro Tour Paris in 2011.  In 2013, he was voted into the Magic: The Gathering Hall of Fame.

Magic: The Gathering
Beginning his career in 1999, Stark first came to prominence in 2004, making back to back Pro Tour Top 8s at Pro Tour Kobe and Pro Tour San Diego.

Stark took a break from the game, not returning until late 2009. Since his return, Ben Stark has been considered a Limited expert.

Stark went on to have great success in the 2011 Pro Tour Season, reaching the finals of Grand Prix Atlanta and winning his first Pro Tour at Pro Tour Paris. These finishes, along with other strong finishes throughout the season, led Ben to be a front-runner in the 2011 Pro Player of Year race.  Ultimately, Ben would finish in joint 3rd place in the Player of the Year standings, alongside Martin Juza, with 56 pro points.  Commentators argued that Stark hurt his chances of winning the Player of the Year title by failing to attend US Nationals and certain Grand Prix events.

The 2012-13 Pro Tour Season was another very successful season for Stark.  Stark made the Top 8 of four Grand Prix events, including a win at Grand Prix Indianapolis, and made his fourth Pro Tour Top 8 at Pro Tour Gatecrash. Stark's performance left him with a season total of 61 Pro Points, placing him 5th in the Player of the Year race, and an invite to the 2013 World Championship, where he made it into the Top 4 players after the Swiss rounds of the World Championship. Stark lost to Shahar Shenhar in the semifinals of the World Championship taking 3rd Place overall.

Achievements

Top 8 appearances

References

American Magic: The Gathering players
Living people
Year of birth missing (living people)
People from Tamarac, Florida